Dahlin is a Swedish surname.  The name can also be spelled Dalin. Both surnames are derived from the Swedish word dal which means valley. Notable people with the surname include:

Anders J. Dahlin (born 1975), Swedish tenor and opera singer 
Bo Dahlin (born 1948), Swedish professor of education
David C. Dahlin (1917–2003), American physician-pathologist
Erik Dahlin (born 1989), Swedish footballer 
Ernst Mauritz Dahlin (1843–1929), Swedish mathematician
Jacob Dahlin (1952–1991), Swedish TV and radio-host
Johan Dahlin (born 1986), Swedish footballer
John Dahlin (1886–1927), Swedish athlete
Jolanta Dahlin (1940–1991), Swedish chess master
Kjell Dahlin (born 1963), Swedish ice hockey player
Marcus Dahlin (footballer) (born 1982), Swedish footballer
Marcus Dahlin (born 1991), Swedish handballer
Martin Dahlin (born 1968), Swedish footballer and sports agent
Olof von Dalin (1708–1763), Swedish poet
Peter Dahlin (activist), Swedish human rights activist
Rasmus Dahlin (born 2000), Swedish ice hockey player

Others
A name for inulin derived from Dahlia tubers

See also
Dalin (disambiguation)

Swedish-language surnames